Zoltán Székely (born 23 February 1952) is a Hungarian fencer. He competed in the individual and team épée events at the 1988 Summer Olympics.

References

External links
 

1952 births
Living people
Hungarian male épée fencers
Olympic fencers of Hungary
Fencers at the 1988 Summer Olympics
Fencers from Budapest